Parnell Bradbury (1904 – August 1977) was a British writer and playwright.  He is known for co-writing Dark Lucy with Philip King.  He was also a theatre critic for The Times.

Bradbury was also a chiropractor and osteopath.  He wrote extensively about these subjects.

Bradbury was a member of Sussex Playwrights.

He died at his home in Lydney, Gloucestershire in August 1977 aged 73.

Bibliography

 Adventures in Healing
 The Mechanics of Healing
 Dark Lucy (with Philip King)

Plays

 The Marzipan Prince
 A Man of No Experience  (one act)
 Off the Camden Road (three acts)
 Calling all kings : a collection of six one-act plays for children

References

1904 births
Place of birth missing
British dramatists and playwrights
English chiropractors
1977 deaths